and VWU Global is a two-year liberal arts college located in the Shinjuku ward of Tokyo, Japan and is a branch campus of Lakeland University in Sheboygan, Wisconsin, U.S. and Virginia Wesleyan University in Virginia Beach, Virginia, U.S.

LUJ/VWU Global has been continuously accredited by the North Central Association of Colleges and Schools and the MEXT (文部科学省) since its inception in 1991. After earning a two-year Associate of Arts (A.A.) degree, students can choose to attend Lakeland University or Virginia Wesleyan University in the United States to complete a four-year Bachelor of Arts (B.A.) degree.

References

External links
Lakeland University Japan/Virginia Wesleyan University Global
Lakeland University
Virginia Wesleyan University

Lakeland University
Universities and colleges in Tokyo
Foreign universities and colleges in Japan
Virginia Wesleyan University
1991 establishments in Japan
Educational institutions established in 1991